Saad Bin Zafar (born 10 November 1986) is a Pakistani-born international cricketer who represents Canada in international cricket and is currently the captain of the Canada men's national team. Saad performs as an all-rounder. He is a left-handed batsman and a slow left-arm orthodox bowler.

Saad holds the world record for completing his maximum quota of overs (4 overs in a 20-over match) without conceding a run in a men's T20I match and has the 5th most maiden overs bowled in T20I career.

Saad also currently holds the record for the highest strike rate of 414.28 in a T20I innings.

Early career
At the age of  10, he started playing tape ball cricket with friends on the streets. Later at the age of 14, his school's sports teacher spotted Saad and introduced him to Leather ball cricket by selecting him for the junior school cricket team. In 2004, he started playing club cricket for Overseas Cricket club in Premier Division. He scored 262 not out in a 50 over game in Scarborough Cricket League Premier Division in August 2015.

Domestic and T20 franchise career
In January 2017, he played for the ICC Americas in the 2016–17 Regional Super50 and was the leading wicket-taker for his team. In his 9 wickets that season, he was able to dismiss the likes of Shai Hope, Chadwick Walton, and Jermaine Blackwood.

On 3 June 2018, he was selected to play for the Vancouver Knights in the players' draft for the inaugural edition of the Global T20 Canada tournament. Saad was the second Canadian player to be selected in the draft after Nikhil Dutta in round 9. In his third match against Montreal Tigers his bowling figure was 3/21 in 4 overs. He was able to take the wickets of Sikandar Raza, George Worker and Najibullah Zadran on duck. In his fifth match against Toronto Nationals he took 2/22 in 3.5 overs and scored unbeaten 12 in 47-run winning partnership with Chadwick Walton.

In the final match of 2018 Global T20 Canada against West Indies B cricket team, he took 2 wickets including the wicket of Fabian Allen by giving away 26 runs in 4 overs, also having a wicket maiden over. Vancouver Knights didn't have an ideal start to the chase as Chadwick Walton, Chris Gayle and Ben Dunk fell cheaply to leave them at 22 for 3 but Saad and Rassie van der Dussen came up with a crucial unbeaten 126-run partnership to get Knights back on track in the chase. Saad played the role of an aggressor, dealing in regular boundaries to bring up a 32-ball fifty. He collected eight fours and three sixes in his unbeaten 48-ball stay for 79 runs. Saad was adjudged man of the match for his brilliant all-round performance.

In September 2018, he was called up as a replacement player of Bangladesh's allrounder Mahmudullah by St Kitts and Nevis Patriots for CPL playoffs .

In June 2019, he was selected to play for the Vancouver Knights franchise team in the 2019 Global T20 Canada tournament. He had a successful tournament as he was the leading wicket-taker for the Vancouver Knights. In his 4th match against Edmonton Royals, his bowling figure was 2/34 in 4 overs, including the wicket of Shadab Khan on a golden duck.

In the Qualifier 1 against Brampton Wolves, Saad was able to pick up 4 wickets by only giving 22 runs in 4 overs. He bowled exceptionally well in the 8th over in which he bagged 3 wickets by only giving 1 run which included the wicket of Shahid Afridi on a golden duck and the captain Colin Munro, who scored the fastest 50 of the tournament. His outstanding bowling spell got him the well-deserved man of the match award and led the Vancouver Knights into finals. In the final match against Winnipeg Hawks, he had an 86-run 5th wicket partnership with Shoaib Malik and 53-run 6th wicket partnership with Andre Russell. Due to the high run rate requirement, Vancouver couldn't find success chasing the 192 target set by the Hawks and loss in the super over.

In July 2019, he was selected to play for the Amsterdam Knights in the inaugural edition of the Euro T20 Slam cricket tournament. However, the following month the tournament was cancelled.

In December 2019, he was selected to play for the Falcon Hunters in the Qatar T10 League. Falcon Hunters were named Champions for the inaugural season by beating Swift Gallopers by 4 wickets. Saad had a successful tournament just like his team by being the fifth leading wicket-taker of the season. In his six dismissals, he was able to collect key wickets of Mohammad Hafeez and Kamran Akmal.

In July 2020, he was named in the St Lucia Zouks squad for the 2020 Caribbean Premier League.

In September 2020, he was added to the Houston Hurricanes squad for the 2021 Minor League Cricket season. He was later traded to the Michigan Cricket Stars. He was the most economical bowler for Michigan Cricket Stars with 5.7 economy rate and was able to pick up 14 wickets from 12 matches.

In July 2022, he was selected to play for the Muzaffarabad Tigers following the players' draft for the 2022 Kashmir Premier League. Despite Muzaffarabad Tigers ending up at the bottom of the points table, Saad had a successful stint by being the 4th most economical bowler of the season with the economy rate of 6.26 from 5 matches.

International career

Early years 
In June 2008 Saad was named in Canada's Squad for the 2007–08 ICC Intercontinental Cup. He made his International debut on 4 July 2008 playing against Bermuda. He looked impressive in his debut as he took 4 wickets, including the wicket of Bermuda's captain Irving Romaine who was close to scoring a century.

In December 2009, he was named in Canada's squad for the 2010 Quadrangular Twenty20 Series in Sri Lanka. In January 2010, he was named in Canada's squad for the 2010 ICC World Twenty20 Qualifier tournament in the United Arab Emirates. He made his T20 debut against UAE in the 9th match of the tournament.

Comeback 
In April 2015, he made a comeback into international cricket by getting named in Canada's squad for the 2015 ICC Americas Twenty20 Division One. In June 2015, he was named in Canada's squad for the 2015 ICC World Twenty20 Qualifier tournament hosted by Scotland and Ireland. He was the most economical bowler for Canada with 6.23 economy rate from 5 matches.

In May 2017, he was named in Canada's squad for the 2017 ICC World Cricket League Division Three tournament in Uganda. In January 2018, he was named in Canada's squad for the 2018 ICC World Cricket League Division Two tournament in Namibia. In August 2018, he was named in Canada's squad for the 2018–19 ICC World Twenty20 Americas Qualifier tournament in Morrisville, North Carolina.

In April 2019, he was named in Canada's squad for the 2019 ICC World Cricket League Division Two tournament in Namibia. Even though Canada was not able to gain ODI status but he had a successful tournament by being the leading wicket-taker for Canada, with 11 dismissals in 6 matches.
In August 2019, he was named in Canada's squad for the Regional Finals of the 2018–19 ICC T20 World Cup Americas Qualifier tournament. He made his Twenty20 International (T20I) debut for Canada against the Cayman Islands on 18 August 2019. In September 2019, he was named in Canada's squad for the 2019 Malaysia Cricket World Cup Challenge League A tournament and was the most economical bowler for Canada with the economy rate of 3.50 from 5 matches.

In October 2019, he was named in Canada's squad for the 2019 ICC T20 World Cup Qualifier tournament in the United Arab Emirates. He was the leading wicket-taker for Canada in the tournament, with 9 dismissals in 5 matches.

In October 2021, he was named in Canada's squad for the 2021 ICC Men's T20 World Cup Americas Qualifier tournament in Antigua. On 14 November 2021, in Canada's match against Panama, Saad became the first bowler to bowl four overs in a T20I match without conceding a run. In February 2022, he was named in Canada's squad for the 2022 ICC Men's T20 World Cup Global Qualifier A tournament in Oman.

In July 2022, he was appointed as the captain of Canada's squad against Nepal's tour of Canada which was scheduled for Nepal's preparation of 2022 Scotland Tri-Nation Series. The tour had two One Day matches scheduled but persistent rain had completely washed out the first match however in the second match Canada secured 83 runs convincing win over Nepal. In July 2022, he was named in Canada's squad for the 2022 Canada Cricket World Cup Challenge League A tournament. In the sixth match of the tournament, against Malaysia, he took his first five-wicket haul in List A cricket.

In October 2022, he was named as the captain of Canada's Squad for the 2022 Desert Cup T20I Series and also for a bilateral 50-over-a-side three-match series against Oman to prepare for the final event of the 2019–2022 ICC Cricket World Cup Challenge League. On 14 November 2022, in Canada's Match against Bahrain, Saad scored unbeaten 29 off 7 balls which made him the second batsman to bat at a strike rate of 414.28, which is the highest strike rate in T20I innings. Saad had a very successful stint as the captain of Canada by winning both the T20I series as well as the One Day series of 2022 Desert Cup.

In November 2022, he was named as the captain of Canada's squad for the 2022 Malaysia Cricket World Cup Challenge League A tournament. He finished the tournament being the third leading wicket taker of ICC Cricket World Cup Challenge League by taking 25 wickets in 14 matches.

In February 2023, he was appointed as the captain of Canada's squad for Canada's tour of Sri Lanka which consists of four One Day matches against Sri Lanka Development team for the preparation of 2023 ICC Cricket World Cup Qualifier Play-off

References

External links 
 

Living people
1986 births
Canadian cricketers
Canada Twenty20 International cricketers
Cricketers from Gujranwala
Canadian sportspeople of Pakistani descent
St Kitts and Nevis Patriots cricketers
Pakistani emigrants to Canada
Naturalized citizens of Canada
Saint Lucia Kings cricketers